Lorenzo Mascheroni (May 13, 1750 – July 14, 1800) was an Italian mathematician.

Biography 
He was born near Bergamo, Lombardy. At first mainly interested in the humanities (poetry and Greek language), he eventually became professor of mathematics at Pavia.

In his Geometria del Compasso (Pavia, 1797), he proved that any geometrical construction which can be done with compass and straightedge, can also be done with compasses alone. However, the priority for this result (now known as the Mohr–Mascheroni theorem) belongs to the Dane Georg Mohr, who had previously published a proof in 1672 in an obscure book, Euclides Danicus.
This problem was the source of a musical composition called "Mascheroni Circles", performed by David Stutz on the album Iolet.

He died in Paris.

Works

External links
 

1750 births
1800 deaths
People from the Province of Bergamo
18th-century Italian mathematicians
Geometers